Toxicologic Pathology is a peer-reviewed academic journal covering the field of toxicology. The editor-in-chief is Kevin A. Keane, a toxicologic pathologist employed at (Novo Nordisk A/S, Måløv, Denmark). It was established in 1972 and is published by SAGE Publications in association with the Society of Toxicologic Pathology, the British Society of Toxicological Pathology, and the European Society of Toxicologic Pathology.

Abstracting and indexing
The journal is abstracted and indexed in Scopus and the Science Citation Index Expanded. According to the Journal Citation Reports, the journal has a 2018 impact factor of 1.382.

References

External links 
 
 Society of Toxicologic Pathology

SAGE Publishing academic journals
English-language journals
Toxicology journals
Publications established in 1972
Pathology journals